Tractus Catena is a set of pits in the Arcadia quadrangle of Mars. The term "Catena" refers to a chain of craters.

The line of pits that make up Tractus Catena make it related to fossa which are common on Mars.

Dark slope streaks are visible in one of the pictures below.  Such streaks are common on Mars. They occur on steep slopes of craters, troughs, and valleys. The streaks are dark at first. They get lighter with age.  Sometimes they start in a tiny spot, then spread out and go for hundreds of meters. They have been seen to travel around obstacles, like boulders.  It is believed that they are avalanches of bright dust that expose a darker underlying layer.

References

See also

 Dark Slope Streaks
 Fossa (geology)
 Geology of Mars 
 HiRISE

Arcadia quadrangle